The Tell al-Rimah stela or the Stele of Adad-nirari III is a victory stele of Adad-nirari III which may include a reference to an early king of Samaria as "Jehoash the Samarian" which would be the first cuneiform mention of Samaria by that name.

It was discovered in excavations at Tell al-Rimah and is today at the Iraq Museum.

See also 

 Saba'a Stele
 Calah Slab

References

External links 

 The Tell al-Rimah Stela in Livius.org

8th-century BC steles
1967 archaeological discoveries
Ancient Near East steles
Assyrian stelas
Sculpture of the Ancient Near East
Victory steles